The St. Anthony Pegram Truss Railroad Bridge, in Fremont County, Idaho near St. Anthony, Idaho, was built in 1896.  It was listed on the National Register of Historic Places in 1997.

It is a Pegram truss through truss railroad bridge designed by George H. Pegram.

It brought the West Belt Branch of the former Oregon Short Line (later Union Pacific) railroad across Henry's Fork of the Snake River.

It was fabricated in 1896 by the Pencoyd Iron Works in Philadelphia, Pennsylvania and was originally used to span either the Weiser River near Weiser, Idaho or the Payette River near Payette, Idaho. It was moved to its current location in 1914 during construction of the West Belt Branch of the Oregon Short Line.

References

Pegram trusses
Truss bridges
National Register of Historic Places in Fremont County, Idaho
Buildings and structures completed in 1896